Mount Carmel is a census-designated place (CDP) in Clermont County, Ohio, United States. The population was 4,741 at the 2010 census.

History

Mt. Carmel is one of the oldest communities in Union Township. In 1788 surveyor John Obannon and his team came in this mostly unsettled area to prepare for building and developing new homes and businesses. It was mostly inhabited by Revolutionary War soldiers. Their property was basically payment  for fighting the battles through the Ohio Land Grant. This could have included several hundred acres.

A pioneer from New Jersey, John Rose who was one of the first to settle there in 1796, is actually considered the father of Mt. Carmel. The only historical sign of  his presence today is a very small graveyard where he is buried, going down Rose Hill entering Hamilton County. According to one historian, Rose may have picked the name from the Bible.

The Catawba grape industry was a thriving business in the Ohio River Valley because it was hearty enough to withstand the harsh Ohio winters, Farmers in the Mt. Carmel and surrounding area took advantage of this and grape arbors were popping up throughout Union Township contributing to the distinction of the state leading the country in wine production by 1860.

A post office was established in 1887 however it was being built outside the village limits so East Mt Carmel was created so it could take advantage of the benefits. After a few years though the post office was redesignated as Summerside, Ohio. By the twentieth century the Summerside and the nearby Glen Este post offices were both closed and were moved to Newtown, farther west. Recently the Newtown office closed and now the closest post office is on Nagel Road in Anderson Township.

Geography
Mount Carmel is located on the western edge of Union Township at  (39.098679, -84.296044). It is bordered on the north by Summerside and on the west by Dry Run in Anderson Township, Hamilton County.

Ohio State Route 32 forms the northern border of Mount Carmel, and Interstate 275 forms the eastern edge. The highways cross at I-275 Exit 63 at the northeast corner of the community.

Demographics

As of the census of 2000, there were 4,308 people, 1,702 households, and 1,172 families residing in the CDP. The population density was 2,559.3 people per square mile (990.1/km2). There were 1,790 housing units at an average density of 1,063.4/sq mi (411.4/km2). The racial makeup of the CDP was 96.80% White, 0.84% African American, 0.21% Native American, 0.30% Asian, 0.65% from other races, and 1.21% from two or more races. Hispanic or Latino of any race were 1.21% of the population.

There were 1,702 households, out of which 34.5% had children under the age of 18 living with them, 51.2% were married couples living together, 12.6% had a female householder with no husband present, and 31.1% were non-families. 25.0% of all households were made up of individuals, and 6.9% had someone living alone who was 65 years of age or older. The average household size was 2.53 and the average family size was 3.04.

In the CDP the population was spread out, with 26.2% under the age of 18, 10.3% from 18 to 24, 32.1% from 25 to 44, 21.2% from 45 to 64, and 10.1% who were 65 years of age or older. The median age was 34 years. For every 100 females there were 98.8 males. For every 100 females age 18 and over, there were 95.7 males.

The median income for a household in the CDP was $36,382, and the median income for a family was $41,996. Males had a median income of $35,904 versus $25,496 for females. The per capita income for the CDP was $17,393. About 8.8% of families and 9.3% of the population were below the poverty line, including 16.7% of those under age 18 and 2.3% of those age 65 or over.

References

Census-designated places in Clermont County, Ohio